Sadako is a Japanese name, commonly used for women. Sadako is also a film. The same name can be written with a variety of kanji, and the meanings of the name differ accordingly:
, "chaste child"; the same characters can also be read as a Korean female given name, Jeong-ja
, "child of integrity"

People with the name
 , empress consort of the Japanese Emperor Ichijō.
 , later Empress Teimei (貞明皇后) of Japan (1884–1951), wife of Emperor Taishō
 , Japanese poet
 , American businesswoman
 , Japanese scholar and United Nations administrator
 Sadako Pointer (born 1984), American singer
 , a childhood Hiroshima atomic bomb victim, who made origami cranes based on a legend about their healing properties, making them an international symbol for peace.
 , Japanese actress
 , Japanese noble woman
 , Japanese javelin thrower
 , Japanese swimmer

Fictional characters
 , fictional character in the Japanese novel, manga and film franchise Ring

References

Japanese feminine given names